Zenabis Global Inc. is a Canadian medical and recreational marijuana producer.

History
Zenabis was originally known by the name of International Herbs Medical Marijuana Ltd. and was co-founded by Monty Sikka & Mark Catroppa. Originally setup as a pump and dump scheme. in which the owners are well known for; fortunately the dump did not materialize and the company remains at -69,000/yr in annual income. It purchased its first facility in 2014 in New Brunswick, and received a cultivation license from Health Canada in 2017. Zenabis received its sales license for dried marijuana from Health Canada in 2018, and received its license to sell cannabis oil in March 2019. In January 2019 Zenabis’s parent company Sun Pharm completed a reverse take-over of Bevo Agro Inc., leading to the two firms operating under the banner of Zenabis Global Inc. The company was traded on the TSX under the ticker symbol ZENA.

Shai Altman was the President and CEO of Zenabis Inc until its acquisition by HEXO Corp.

Production and distribution
The company distributes medical marijuana in Canada and has agreements to provide recreational marijuana in British Columbia, Alberta, Saskatchewan, Quebec, Nova Scotia, New Brunswick, Manitoba, Prince Edward Island, and the Yukon. Zenabis has a 380,000 square foot cultivation and processing facility in Atholville, New Brunswick, which was one of the largest indoor cannabis cultivation facilities in Canada as of 2019. It also has licensed facilities in Delta, British Columbia and Stellarton, Nova Scotia.  Zenabis also has a 2.1 million square foot greenhouse facility in Langley, British Columbia, which it plans to convert to cannabis production upon licensing approval. As of early 2019, the company had 3.5 million square feet in production capacity, with an annual potential production of 479,700 kg of dried cannabis.
 
In addition to its own cultivation operations, Zenabis also partners with micro-cultivators to produce craft cannabis products, which will be sold under the Founders Reserve brand. In 2019 Zenabis became a medical marijuana supplier for Shoppers Drug Mart. The first product that will be supplied is dried cannabis, which will be followed by cannabis oil, to be sold online. Zenabis has also been involved in launching a marijuana professional program at Kwantlen Polytechnic University.

Products
The name used by Zenabis Global Inc. for its medical marijuana is "Zenabis". In 2018 Zenabis started the Namaste line of recreational marijuana, launched at the time of the legalization of recreational marijuana in Canada. In 2019 the company announced the Blazery line of pre-rolled, high-THC recreational marijuana. That year, Zenabis acquired a 51% stake in Alberta kombucha manufacturer Hilllsboro Corp, in order to begin producing cannabis-infused beverage products when regulations permit.

In September 2019 Zenabis launched the Re-Up brand of recreational cannabis. The company has stated that Re-Up will cater to consumers who currently purchase cannabis from illegal sources, by selling cannabis products at low prices that are comparable to the illicit market.

Like all medical marijuana companies in Canada Zenabis has struggled on the stock market. The company was acquired by HEXO Corp in 2021 in an all-stock deal.

References

External links
 

2014 establishments in Canada
Cannabis companies of Canada
Companies formerly listed on the Toronto Stock Exchange